Sirama River is a river of El Salvador.

References

Rivers of El Salvador